The Hochwald House is a Victorian -story house on 211 West Grand Avenue in Marshall, Texas.  Built 1894 to 1895, the house was named after Isaac Hochwald (1865-1956), a prominent Jewish merchant. In 1912, the house was renovated to include classical revival features. Hochwald, who built the house with his wife Amelia Raphel Hochwald, lived in the house until 1956.

The house was made a Recorded Texas Historic Landmark in 1978 and a historic marker was installed the following year.

See also

National Register of Historic Places listings in Harrison County, Texas
Recorded Texas Historic Landmarks in Harrison County

References

External links

Hochwald House from the Center for Regional Heritage Research, Stephen F. Austin State University

National Register of Historic Places in Harrison County, Texas
Buildings and structures in Marshall, Texas
Recorded Texas Historic Landmarks